Slottsbron is a locality situated in Grums Municipality, Värmland County, Sweden with 1,039 inhabitants in 2010.

Sports 
In Slottsbron there is a local sports club called Slottsbrons IF.

Music 
Sven-Ingvars is a music group from Slottsbron.

References 

Populated places in Värmland County
Populated places in Grums Municipality